This is an incomplete list of music festivals in Canada.

Sublists

By locale

By type
List of classical music festivals#North America
List of electronic music festivals
List of folk festivals#Canada
List of blues festivals in Canada
List of jazz festivals#Canada

Music festivals

Sortable table

Organized by province or territory 

 Lilith Fair, a traveling festival

Alberta

 Astral Harvest, Driftpile
 Beaumont Blues and Roots Festival, Beaumont
 Big Valley Jamboree, Camrose
 Blues on Whyte Block Party, Edmonton
 Calgary Folk Music Festival, Calgary
 Edmonton Folk Music Festival, Edmonton
 Calgary International Blues Festival, Calgary
 Interstellar Rodeo, Edmonton
 North Country Fair, Driftpile
 Reignbough Fiddle Arts & Music Festival, Smokey Lake
 Sled Island, Calgary
 South Country Fair, Ft Macleod
 Sasquatch Gathering, Rangeton Park
 TD Edmonton International Jazz Festival, Edmonton
 Up and DT Festival, Edmonton
 Wild Mountain Music Festival, Hinton

British Columbia
CannaFest Music Festival, Grand Forks
Constellation Festival, Squamish
FVDED In the Park
Shambhala Music Festival
ValhallaFest
Vancouver Folk Music Festival
Wapiti Music Festival, Fernie

Manitoba

 Big Fun Festival, Winnipeg
 Harvest Moon Festival, Clearwater
 Jazz Winnipeg Festival, Winnipeg
 Manitoba Electronic Music Exhibition, Winnipeg
 Matlock Festival of Music Art and Nature, Matlog
 Rainbow Trout Music Festival, St. Malo
 Real Love Summer Fest, Teulon
 sākihiwē festival, Winnipeg
 Winnipeg Folk Festival, Winnipeg
 Winnipeg Music Festival, Winnipeg
 Winnipeg New Music Festival, Winnipeg
 Whoop & Hollar Folk Festival, Portage la Prairie 
 YES FEST, Winnipeg

New Brunswick

 List of festivals in New Brunswick

Newfoundland and Labrador
 Tuckamore Festival, St. John's

Northwest Territories
 Folk on the Rocks

Nova Scotia

 Evolve Festival, Antigonish
 Halifax Pop Explosion, Halifax

Ontario

Prince Edward Island

 Cavendish Beach Music Festival, Cavendish

Quebec

 Eclipse Festival, Sainte-Thérèse-de-la-Gatineau
 Heavy MTL, Montreal
 Île Soniq, Montreal
 Kinetik Festival, Montreal
 Les Francos de Montréal, Montreal
 Longueuil International Percussion Festival, Longueuil
 M for Montreal, Montreal
 Montreal International Jazz Festival, Montreal
 Mundial, Montreal
 MUTEK, Montreal
 Osheaga Festival, Montreal
 Piknic Électronik, Montreal
 Pop Montreal, Montreal
 Quebec City Summer Festival, Quebec City
 Rockfest, Montebello

See also
 List of festivals in Canada
 List of music festivals in the United States

References

External links
 

 
Canada
Canada
Music festivals
Music